Maria Mykolayivna Hrinchenko (13 July 1863 – 15 July 1928, in Bohodukhiv, Ukraine) was a Ukrainian folklorist active at the turn of the 20th century.  She played a significant role in the preservation and development of Ukrainian folklore.

During her life, she collected and published more than 100 Ukrainian folk tales and over 1200 folk proverbs.  She also authored research and memoirs on Opanas Markovych, Leonid Hlibov, Ivan Franko, and Borys Hrinchenko, among others.

Biography
She was born in 1863 as Maria Gladilina near Bohodukhiv, a daughter of a minor official in the local government.  Her family's status afforded her a good education; she studied history, literature and several foreign languages.  She married Borys Hrinchenko, who, together with her father, was instrumental in the foundation of Kharkiv University.

She was a member of Kharkiv academy. Her last years at academy were considered as her most active ones. She met her lifelong friends and later correspondents during this part of her education life. She also became close to the new young principal during her last days in the academy. After leaving academy, she attended female seminary for a brief period of ten months, cut short most likely due to poor health.

Career
Hrinchenko wrote her first works in German, beginning in 1880. Besides a proficiency in German she spoke Ukrainian as well as Polish. Taras Shevchenko and Ivan Franko were the main inspiration of her early poetry. It was associated with the poet's loneliness, social isolation and by an adoration of Ukrainian nation’s freedom. Her first collection of poetry was published in 1898.

In 1887-1893 she worked as a teacher in a people school of Khrystyna Alchevska that today is located in Luhansk Oblast.

Influences
In addition to Shevchenko and Franko, Hrinchenko's work was influenced by Henrik Ibsen, Edmondo De Amicis and Leo Tolstoy.

External links
 Skrypnyk, P. Maria Hrinchenko (ГРІНЧЕНКО МАРІЯ МИКОЛАЇВНА). Encyclopedia of History of Ukraine. 2004

1863 births
1928 deaths
People from Bohodukhiv
People from Kharkov Governorate
Ukrainian people in the Russian Empire
Ukrainian folklorists
Women folklorists
Ukrainian women writers
Ukrainian women academics